Saidabad-e Olya (also Romanized as Sa‘īdābād-e ‘Olyā and Sa‘id Abad Olya; also known as Sa‘īdābād, Sa‘īdābād-e Bālā, Saiyidābād, and Seydābād) is a village in Saidabad Rural District, in the Central District of Ijrud County, Zanjan Province, Iran. At the 2006 census, its population was 913, in 266 families.

The language spoken in this region is Tati language.

References 

Populated places in Ijrud County